Nedyu Rachev (born 4 October 1915, date of death unknown) was a Bulgarian cyclist. He competed in the sprint event at the 1936 Summer Olympics.

References

External links
 

1915 births
Year of death missing
Bulgarian male cyclists
Olympic cyclists of Bulgaria
Cyclists at the 1936 Summer Olympics
Place of birth missing